As I Came of Age is the second studio album by English soprano Sarah Brightman. The album features a diverse collection of songs including "Good Morning Starshine" from the musical Hair, "Yesterday" by Aimee Mann, "Love Changes Everything" from Andrew Lloyd Webber's Aspects of Love, and "Some Girls" by Lisa Burns and Sal Maida. Cover art showcases a Robert Blakeman photograph of Brightman imposed onto the Arthur Hughes painting "The Kings' Orchard" (c. 1858).

Track listing

Singles
"Something to Believe In" (1990)

1990 albums
Sarah Brightman albums
Albums produced by Val Garay
Polydor Records albums